Adrian Frederick Joseph Jack (born 16 March 1943, in England) is a British Composer.

Biography 

Adrian Jack was born on 16 March 1943, in Datchet, near Slough, Buckinghamshire, England. He was educated at Merchant Taylors' School, Northwood (1954–60), and the Royal College of Music, London (1961–64), where he studied composition with Peter Racine Fricker, fugue and orchestration with Gordon Jacob, piano with Antony Hopkins and organ with John Birch. From 1967 to 1969 he studied composition and electronic music with Włodzimierz Kotoński at the State Higher School of Music in Warsaw, Poland.

Jack started composing at the age of 13. He later studied at the Royal College of Music. The main conscious influence at that time was Messiaen. Hearing Boulez's "Le marteau sans maitre" brought a new atonal complexity to his music, replaced by an austere paring-down following his discovery of Edgard Varèse. He actually wrote to Varèse to ask if he could study with him in New York and received a letter of refusal, not very long before Varèse died in November 1965.

For the next 20 years, Jack composed somewhat intermittently, but his works included "Holly Bush", written in Poland and given a public rehearsal by the London Sinfonietta under Roger Norrington at the Queen Elizabeth Hall, London; a piano concerto for Roger Woodward, which was never performed; a monodic piece for any instruments or voices, "You told me so yourself", which received performances by different soloists and groups both in England and abroad; and "A piece for learning" – a "variable" score performed under Richard Bernas's direction at the Dartington Summer School.

Jack lectured at the Royal College of Music from 1969 to 1977, then he joined BBC Radio 3 as a script-writer for music programmes. He left the BBC in 1993 and for the next ten years was active as a freelance music critic and devised and presented several radio programmes on music and architecture for BBC Radio 3 with the producers Tim Thorne and Antony Pitts, and two notable examples of radiogenic work, "Chromatic Fantasy" and "From the Diary of a Fly". Jack had written about music regularly since 1970, first for the monthly Music and Musicians, then for Time Out, where he was Classical Music and Opera Editor from 1975 to 77, as well as for most of the quality national papers, notably The Guardian and, later, The Independent. The other activity was as director of a series at the Institute of Contemporary Arts (ICA) in London, devoted to new music. It ran from 1978 to 1995.

In 1986 the American pianist Yvar Mikhashoff requested a tango ("Tin-Pan Tango") to perform at the Almeida Festival in London. This kick-started a revival in Jack's composition. Reacting against his own earlier music and most of the experimental or avant-garde music he promoted at the ICA, Jack now wrote music which is, broadly speaking, tonal, and in which the emphasis is on continuity and a sense of line. Among his ensemble pieces, "Jigsaw" and "Notelette" were requested and performed by Sounds Positive, while "Zigzag" was requested and performed (including a broadcast on Radio 3) by Cambridge New Music Players (now known as "New Music Players". His "Piano Trio" (the first of three works for the medium) was originally requested and performed by London New Music and became his most widely played work, taken up by three other groups and broadcast twice in different performances. Jack's first two string quartets were played and broadcast by The Smith Quartet, and the third, fourth, fifth and sixth recorded by the Arditti Quartet for the Deux-Elles. Of over 50 solo piano pieces, many have been performed and broadcast by Noriko Kawai and Iain Burnside, and all of Jack's music for piano duo has been performed by the Danish-based duo, Ingryd Thorson and Julian Thurber. Many of his scores are lodged with the British Music Information Centre (BMIC) and recordings at the British Library Sound Archive.

Owing to ill health Adrian Jack no longer composes or makes public appearances.

Notes

External links 
List of compositions
Official Website
Adrian Jack at Deux-Elles Classical Recordings
Profile by Nick Breckenfield from www.classicalsource.com
Works available in the British Music Information Centre
Piano duo Thorson and Thurber

1943 births
20th-century classical composers
Alumni of the Royal College of Music
British music critics
English classical composers
Living people
People from Datchet
English male classical composers
20th-century English composers
20th-century British male musicians